Cathcart Trinity Church is one of two Church of Scotland Parish churchs in the Cathcart area of Glasgow.

History of the building
The church was designed by William Gardner Rowan in a richly decorated Neo-Gothic style. The foundation stone was laid on 8 April 1893, with the building being completed a year later, officially opening on 3 May 1894. The old church hall was the original church, having been built in 1889. Another hall, named the Buchanan Hall, was built in 1912.

Architecture 
The church includes an elaborate pinnacled buttressed front, that includes a central window with Art Nouveau stained glass above the centre door. A ventilator tower was also added to the slated roof.

History of the Congregation 
The church was founded as the Cathcart United Presbyterian Church. After the United Presbyterian Church united with the Free Church of Scotland in 1900 to form the United Free Church of Scotland, the church was renamed the Cathcart United Free Church. The congregation became part of the Church of Scotland in 1929, after the merger of the denominations. It was then renamed Cathcart South Church. In November 2002, the congregation of Cathcart New Church united with Cathcart South to form the Cathcart Trinity congregation. The old Cathcart South church building was retained as the official parish church building, while the Cathcart New building was sold and converted into flats.

References

Churches completed in 1894
Church of Scotland churches in Glasgow
Listed churches in Glasgow
Category B listed buildings in Glasgow
1893 establishments in Scotland